Jenő Karafiáth (31 July 1883 – 26 May 1952) was a Hungarian politician, who served as Minister of Religion and Education between 1931 and 1932. He was the chairman of the Hungarian Tourist Association from 1920. He served as Lord Mayor of Budapest from 1937 to 1942. His hobby was the poetry, he published several poems to the newspaper of Új idők.

References
 Magyar Életrajzi Lexikon

1883 births
1952 deaths
Education ministers of Hungary
Lord Mayors of Budapest